Gyroscala lamellosa, common name : the lamellose wentletrap, is a species of medium-sized predatory sea snail, a marine gastropod mollusc in the family Epitoniidae, the wentletraps.

Synonyms
In the course of time, this species has been given many names by different authors.

 Cirsotrema perplexa (Pease, 1863)
 Epitonium albocostatum (Turton, 1932)
 Epitonium angustum (Mörch, 1875)
 Epitonium basicum Dall, 1917
 Epitonium consors (Crosse & P. Fischer, 1864)
 Epitonium filare (Mörch, 1875)
 Epitonium perplexum (Pease, 1863)
 Epitonium pyramis Tinker, 1952
 Epitonium rietensis (Turton, 1932)
 Gyroscala angusta (Mörch, 1875)
 Gyroscala commutata (Monterosato, 1877)
 Gyroscala hachijoensis Taki, 1957
 Gyroscala perplexa (Pease, 1863)
 Gyroscala purplexa Taki, 1957
 Gyroscala pyramis (Tinker, 1952)
 Nitidiscala basica (Dall, 1917)
 Opalia consors (Crosse & P. Fischer, 1864)
 Pomiscala perplicata (Iredale, 1929)
 Pomiscala reevesbyi Cotton, 1938
 Scala filaris Mörch, 1875
 Scala perplicata Iredale, 1929
 Scala torquata Fenaux, 1943
 Scalaria albocostata Turton, 1932
 Scalaria candida Monterosato, 1877
 Scalaria clathrus G. B. Sowerby, 1842
 Scalaria commutata Monterosato, 1877
 Scalaria consors Crosse & P. Fischer, 1864
 Scalaria fimbriosa W. Wood, 1842
 Scalaria lamellosa Lamarck, 1822 (basionym)
 Scalaria monocycla Lamarck, 1822
 Scalaria perplexa Pease, 1863
 Scalaria pseudoscalaris Brocchi, 1814
 Scalaria rietensis Turton, 1932
 Scalaria rufanensis Turton, 1932

Distribution
This species has a worldwide distribution in shallow water, from New Zealand and Australia to the Hawaiian Islands; in European waters, the Mediterranean Sea, the Atlantic Ocean (Angola, Cape Verde, West Africa), the Indian Ocean (Macaronesian Islands, Mascarene  Basin, Mozambique) and the Caribbean Sea.

Description
The shell size varies between 9 mm and 40 mm

References

 Powell A. W. B., New Zealand Mollusca, William Collins Publishers Ltd, Auckland, New Zealand 1979 
 Gofas, S.; Le Renard, J.; Bouchet, P. (2001). Mollusca, in: Costello, M.J. et al. (Ed.) (2001). European register of marine species: a check-list of the marine species in Europe and a bibliography of guides to their identification. Collection Patrimoines Naturels, 50: pp. 180–213
 Drivas, J. & M. Jay (1988). Coquillages de La Réunion et de l'île Maurice
 Rolán E., 2005. Malacological Fauna From The Cape Verde Archipelago. Part 1, Polyplacophora and Gastropoda
 Muller, Y. (2004). Faune et flore du littoral du Nord, du Pas-de-Calais et de la Belgique: inventaire. [Coastal fauna and flora of the Nord, Pas-de-Calais and Belgium: inventory]. Commission Régionale de Biologie Région Nord Pas-de-Calais: France. 307 pp

External links
 

Epitoniidae
Gastropods of Australia
Gastropods of New Zealand
Gastropods described in 1822
Molluscs of the Atlantic Ocean
Molluscs of the Pacific Ocean
Molluscs of the Indian Ocean
Molluscs of the Mediterranean Sea